The Congress of Lesotho Trade Unions (COLETU) is a national trade union center in Lesotho.

References

Trade unions in Lesotho